Plasmodium zonuriae is a parasite of the genus Plasmodium subgenus Lacertamoeba. 

As in all Plasmodium species, P. zonuriae has both vertebrate and insect hosts. The vertebrate hosts for this parasite are reptiles.

Taxonomy 
The parasite was first described by Pienaar in 1962.

Distribution 
This species is found in Africa.

Vectors
Not known.

Hosts 
This species infects cordylid lizards (Cordylidae).

References 

zonuriae